Wila Qullu (Aymara wila red or blood, qullu mountain, "red mountain", Hispanicized spelling Wila Kkollu), also Cerro Laguna (Spanish cerro hill, laguna lake, lagoon), is a  mountain in the Andes  located on the border of Bolivia and Chile in the Cordillera Occidental. Wila Qullu lies between the Salar de Huasco in the Tarapacá Region of Chile and the Salar de Uyuni in Bolivia. On the Bolivian side it is situated in the Potosí Department, Daniel Campos Province, Llica Municipality, Canquella Canton, north of the village of Pampa Anta.

See also
 Ch'alla Qullu
 Ch'api Qullu
 Waylla
 List of mountains in the Andes

References

External links 
 Llica Municipality: population data and map showing Canquella Canton and the village Pampa Anta. Wila Qullu is situated north of it on the border.

Mountains of Chile
Mountains of Potosí Department
Landforms of Tarapacá Region